Saint-Apollinaire is a commune in the Côte-d'Or department in eastern France.

Population

Sport
Saint-Apollinaire is home to a small concentration of some of the best sporting facilities in the Greater Dijon area. The sports complex to the south-east of the town is of major importance on the scale of Greater Dijon.

The town is represented in rugby union by ASC Saint Apollinaire-Talant RC, currently in Fédérale 3; the fifth tier of French rugby.

See also
Communes of the Côte-d'Or department

References

Communes of Côte-d'Or